Ziegfeld Follies is a 1945 American musical comedy film released by Metro-Goldwyn-Mayer, primarily directed by Vincente Minnelli, with segments directed by Lemuel Ayers, Roy Del Ruth, Robert Lewis, and George Sidney, the film's original director before Minnelli took over. Other directors that are claimed to have made uncredited contributions to the film are Merrill Pye, Norman Taurog, and Charles Walters. It stars many MGM leading talents, including Fred Astaire, Lucille Ball, Lucille Bremer, Fanny Brice (the only member of the ensemble who was a star of the original Follies), Judy Garland, Kathryn Grayson, Lena Horne, Gene Kelly, James Melton, Victor Moore, William Powell, Red Skelton, and Esther Williams.

Producer Arthur Freed wanted to create a film along the lines of the Ziegfeld Follies Broadway shows, and so, the film is composed of a sequence of unrelated lavish musical numbers and comedy sketches. Some of them, such as Pay the Two Dollars, originated in George White's Scandals. Filmed in 1944 and 1945, it was released in 1946 to considerable critical and box-office success.

The film was entered into the 1947 Cannes Film Festival.

Plot summary
The movie opens with the camera panning over a Heaven somewhere beyond the sky. The residences of great showmen gone to their eternal reward are shown: Shakespeare, whose home looks like the Globe Theater; P.T.Barnum, whose residence in the afterlife resembles a circus Big Top; and Florenz Ziegfeld, whose home's entrance is reminiscent of the theater where he staged the Ziegfeld Follies on Broadway.

Talking to the audience, Ziegfeld guides the viewers along a wall with three-dimensional paintings or shadow boxes containing dolls that look like the stars he cast in his Follies over the years. The film dissolves into a stop-motion puppet sequence as Ziegfeld provides a voice-over of the opening of one of his shows.

Following this, he steps out onto a balcony, musing how he wishes he could stage just one more Follies, with current and past stars in the cast. A Higher Power causes a cigar-sized crayon and a sheet of parchment to appear, and Ziegfeld begins to write. As he does so, the skits and performance numbers appear on the screen.

Cast
 Fred Astaire as Fred Astaire
 Lucille Ball as Lucille Ball
 Lucille Bremer as Princess
 Fanny Brice as Norma Edelman
 Judy Garland as The Star
 Kathryn Grayson as Kathryn Grayson
 Lena Horne as Lena Horne
 Gene Kelly as Gentleman
 James Melton as Alfredo
 Victor Moore as Lawyer's Client
 Red Skelton as J. Newton Numbskull
 Esther Williams as Esther Williams
 William Powell as Florenz Ziegfeld Jr.
 Edward Arnold as Lawyer
 Virginia O'Brien as Virginia O'Brien

Key songs/dance routines
Dance director was Robert Alton, Astaire's second-most-frequent choreographic collaborator after Hermes Pan. All of Astaire's numbers were directed by Vincente Minnelli. The movie's opening featured William Powell as Ziegfeld, who does the prologue.

 "Here's to the Girls/"Bring on the Wonderful Men": by Roger Edens and Arthur Freed. Sung by Astaire with a short solo dance by Cyd Charisse, followed by Lucille Ball cracking a whip over eight chorus-girl panthers, and finally Virginia O'Brien spoofs the previous scene by singing "Bring On Those Wonderful Men". Van Johnson, Fred MacMurray and Mischa Auer are cited in the song as men she finds interesting.
 "This Heart of Mine": classic standard by Harry Warren and Arthur Freed and written specially for Astaire who sings it to Bremer and then leads her in an extravagantly romantic dance of seduction and power-play. The choreography integrates rotating floors, concealed treadmills and swirling dance motifs.
 "Love": another standard, this time by Hugh Martin and Ralph Blane, sung by Lena Horne.
 "Limehouse Blues": conceived as a "dramatic pantomime" with Astaire as a proud but poverty-stricken Chinese labourer whose infatuation with the unattainable Bremer leads to tragedy. The story serves as bookends for a dream ballet inspired by Chinese dance motifs in a vast and extravagant setting, as both Astaire and Bremer perform in yellowface.
 "The Great Lady Has an Interview": written by Kay Thompson and Roger Edens originally for Greer Garson (she turned it down). Judy Garland spoofs a movie star who can only be cast in Oscar-winning dramas, but wants to play "sexy" roles (a la Greer Garson, or Katharine Hepburn) giving an interview to dancing reporters about "her next picture": a bio-pic of Madame Cremantante (the "inventor of the safety pin"). Originally to be directed by Garland's friend Charles Walters, Vincente Minnelli ended up directing the sequence (the two were dating at the time), and Walters was reassigned as choreographer.
 "The Babbitt and the Bromide": Astaire and Kelly team up in a comedy song and dance challenge in three sections, to music and lyrics by George and Ira Gershwin. All choreography was by Astaire (third section) and Kelly (sections one and two). This was the only time Astaire and Kelly appeared on screen together in their prime. In spite of efforts by Freed and Minnelli, the two would not partner again on film until That's Entertainment, Part II in 1976.
 "There's Beauty Everywhere": originally filmed as a balletic finale with tenor James Melton singing and Fred Astaire, Cyd Charisse, and Lucille Bremer dancing in a melange of soap bubbles. But when the bubble machine malfunctioned (leaving only a fragment of the number filmed) and the formula flowed into the hallways of the soundstage, the number had to be restaged and the Astaire and Bremer part of this number was cut out altogether." Kathryn Grayson replaced Melton. Segments of the "bubble dance" with Charisse remain in the final film.

Surviving outtake of introduction
An early concept was to have the film introduced by a stop motion animated puppet of Leo the Lion. Although cut before release, this outtake footage survives today.

Reception
The New York Times: "The film's best numbers are a couple of comedy skits, especially one done by Red Skelton. Fanny Brice plays a Bronx hausfrau quite funnily. Judy Garland is also amusing as a movie queen giving an interview. Ziegfeld Follies is entertaining – and that's what it's meant to be!" (Bosley Crowther).

Newsweek: "At least three of the numbers would highlight any review on stage and screen. In A Great Lady has an Interview, Judy Garland, with six leading men, displays an unexpected flair for occupational satire. With Numbers Please Keenan Wynn demonstrates, once again, that he is one of Hollywood's foremost comedians. But the dance act for the archives is The Babbitt and the Bromide Fred Astaire and Gene Kelly trade taps and double-takes to a photo finish."

Box office
According to MGM records, the film earned $3,569,000 in the US and Canada, and $1,775,000 elsewhere - but because of its large cost, it incurred a loss to the studio of $269,000.

Accolades
1947 Cannes Film Festival Best Musical Comedy (Prix de la meilleure comédie musicale) Won

The film is recognized by American Film Institute in these lists:
 2006: AFI's Greatest Movie Musicals – Nominated

References

 John Mueller: Astaire Dancing – The Musical Films of Fred Astaire, Knopf 1985,

Further reading

External links

 
 
 
 
 The Judy Garland Online Discography "Ziegfeld Follies" pages.
 

1945 films
1945 musical comedy films
American musical comedy films
1940s English-language films
American anthology films
Metro-Goldwyn-Mayer films
Films directed by Vincente Minnelli
Films directed by Roy Del Ruth
Films directed by George Sidney
Films directed by Charles Walters
Films produced by Arthur Freed
Films scored by Lennie Hayton
Films with screenplays by Irving Brecher
Palme d'Or winners
1940s American films